Voivodeship road 835 in Poland is a voivodeship road linking Lublin with Biłgoraj, Przemyśl, and Sanok. It is one of the main highways in Lublin province.

The road is included in the heavy traffic on sections of Lublin – Piotrków and Tarnawa Mała – Frampol has hardened shoulders. Almost the entire length, except for the initial segment in Lublin (Kunicki Street) has one lane in each direction.

Cities and towns lying along the route 
 Lublin
 Frampol
 Biłgoraj
 Tarnogród
 Sieniawa
 Przeworsk
 Kańczuga
 Dynow
 Grabownica Starzeńska

835